Hover may refer to:

 Levitation, the process by which an object or person is suspended by a physical force against gravitation without solid physical contact

Computing
Hover (domain registrar)
Mouse hover or mouseover, a gesture made with the pointer in computer user interfaces

Transport
Hover (helicopter), nearly stationary flight in a helicopter
Hovercraft, vehicles capable of traveling and being stationary over land, water, mud or ice
Hovertrain, a type of high-speed train
Great Wall Hover, a Sport utility vehicle produced by Great Wall Motors
Johan E. Høver, a Norwegian aircraft designer, most noted for the Høver M.F. 11

Other uses
Hover (EP), a 2005 EP by Hair Peace Salon
Hover Chamber Choir, an Armenian choir
Hover!, a computer game for Microsoft Windows
 A partial squatting position often used by women to urinate without sitting

See also

Hoover (disambiguation)
Windhover (disambiguation), various meanings including the Common Kestrel